Mrs Caldicot's Cabbage War is a 2002 British comedy-drama film, directed by Ian Sharp and starring Pauline Collins, John Alderton and Peter Capaldi. It is based on a 1993 novel with the same name by author and conspiracy theorist Vernon Coleman.

It is the story about a woman, Thelma Caldicot, who is coerced by her manipulative son Derek and daughter-in-law to move into a run-down nursing home, owned by Derek's employer, after the death of her bullying husband. Derek also gets her to sign over her house to him. However, she doesn't like it at the nursing home and shows her frustration. After having been medicated by the staff to stay calm, she finally incites her fellow inmates to revolt.

The film premiered in June 2002 at the International Filmfest Emden, where it came second in the competition for the Bernhard Wicki Prize. A few weeks later, it participated in the Moscow International Film Festival. The film had its first wide cinema release in United Kingdom and Ireland, where it opened on 31 January 2003.

Cast
 Pauline Collins as Thelma Caldicot
 Terence Rigby as Henry Caldicot
 Peter Capaldi as Derek
 Anna Wilson-Jones as Veronica
 Gwenllian Davies as Audrey
 Sheila Reid as Joyce
 Frank Mills as Leslie
 Frank Middlemass as Bernard
 John Alderton as Hawksmoor
 Isla Blair as Matron
 Angela Bruce as Gina
 Paul Freeman as Jenkins
 Martin Jarvis as JB
 Tony Robinson as Nick Reid
 Camille Coduri as news journalist

Reception 
BBC Films awarded the film a 1 star review, reporting that the film was 'Lacking in laughs and light on radical zeal, this is the kind of unambitious British cinema that should have been pensioned off a long time ago.'

References

External links
 
 
 
 

Films directed by Ian Sharp
2002 films
British comedy-drama films
2000s English-language films
2000s British films